At least three ships of the Russian navy have borne the name Pyotr Veliky, Petr Veliky or Pyotr Velikiy (Пётр Вели́кий), in honor of Peter the Great of Russia

 , an ironclad warship launched in 1872.
 , an icebreaker launched in 1912.
 , a  originally named Yuri Andropov. She was launched in 1996.

Russian Navy ship names